Hutton Bonville is a hamlet and civil parish in the Hambleton District of North Yorkshire, England. The population of the civil parish as of the 2011 census was less than 100. Details are included in the civil parish of Danby Wiske with Lazenby.

In the Imperial Gazetteer of England and Wales (1870–72) John Marius Wilson described Hutton Bonville:

When Nikolaus Pevsner visited the hamlet in the early 1960s, to write the entry for his Yorkshire: The North Riding volume of the Buildings of England, he described the estate church of St Lawrence as "away from anywhere except the decaying Hall". The Hall was demolished in the 1960s, although the gate piers at the start of the drive remain and are a Grade II listed structure. St Lawrence's was declared redundant in 2007. It is now in the care of the Friends of Friendless Churches.

References

Sources

External links

Villages in North Yorkshire
Civil parishes in North Yorkshire